K. S. Balachandran (Tamil: கே. எஸ். பாலச்சந்திரன், 10 July 1944 – 26 February 2014) was a Sri Lankan Tamil actor, writer, director and producer for plays and film working in Canada. Married to Edna Balachandran. He has 2 children Vasiekaran Balachandran married to Lavanya Paul and Uma Sophia married to Trushan Handy.  He had many grandchildren including Celina Balasandran, Katrina Balasandran and Jason Handy.  His career spanned more than 40 years in the Tamil film industry (Kollywood).  He has written, directed and acted in numerous films, plays and television serials in Sri Lanka for over 30 years.  His film making had continued in Toronto, Ontario, Canada, where he has also acted in many local films and plays often tackling critical cultural and community issues.  He hosted a television talk-show, The Wonderful YT Lingam Show where he satirized current news and events.

Actor
He acted initially in the monthly comedy programs in Tamil produced in front of the live audience at Sri Lanka Broadcasting Corporation. From 1970, he was in the actor's pool of the Tamil National Service of SLBC and became very popular with the listeners through the radio plays broadcast every Wednesday and Saturday. He played the main role "Somu" in the famous Radio serial play "Thaniyatha Thagam". This play written by famous poet and writer Sillaiyoor Selvarajan was sponsored by People's Bank and broadcast for more than two years. He acted in many other serial plays like " Kiramathu Kanaugal", "Vizuthugal" and also in a comedy serial titled" Vaaththiyar Veeddil". The last play written and acted by Balachandran has helped Indian Actor Kamal Hassan in his film "Tenali" to speak Jaffna dialect.

Writer
He wrote many comedy skits for "Kathambam","Maththappu", "Kuthukalam" programs recorded with live audience at Studio 6 in Sri Lanka Broadcasting Corporation. He wrote many plays for broadcast in National Service. The popular serial play titled "Kiramathu Kanavukal" was written by him for Commercial Service and this play was released in Audio Cassettes at a grand function held at Ramakrishna Mission Hall, Colombo. Another comedy serial written by him, "Vaththiar Veedil" was broadcast for more than two years and as Audio cassettes sold in many countries. He wrote series of articles in magazines like "Chirithiran" and "Eelanadu Sunday Magazine". His short stories were published in national dailies like "Thinakaran" and Veerakesari. He wrote scripts for television plays like "Thiruppankal" and documentaries for Rubavahini in Sri Lanka. In Canada he wrote screenplay for films like "Engo Tholaivil", "Menmaiyana Vairangal" and "Uyire Uyire". He wrote and directed more than 20 stage plays in Canada. He wrote and produced "Maname Maname", a radio serial play for CMR Radio, Toronto. He has written a novel titled "Karaiyai Thedum Kaddumarangal", which won him Amuthan adikal Literary award for year 2009 in South India.

Producer
He produced and presented "Kalai Kolam", a popular magazine program with reviews of movies, stage plays, books and dance recitals broadcast by SLBC.
Death
K.S Balachandran died in February of 2013 due to heart conditions.

References

Sri Lankan Tamil actors
Sri Lankan Tamil writers
Tamil comedians
1944 births
2014 deaths
Sri Lankan emigrants to Canada
People from Jaffna
Tamil male actors
Canadian people of Sri Lankan Tamil descent